The State Fair of Virginia is a state fair held annually at the end of September at The Meadow Event Park in Doswell, Virginia.  Through 2008, the fair was held at the Richmond Raceway Complex, located in eastern Henrico County, just outside the capital city of Richmond. It is owned by the Virginia Farm Bureau Federation.

The Fair has offered rides, carnival games, concerts, and typical fair foods such as cotton candy and funnel cakes as well as Virginia's favorites barbecue chicken and peanuts. The Fair has also offered technological, agricultural, historical, and livestock exhibitions and competitions, including pig races. Several of the competitions offered scholarships to students that competed. Entertainment includes log-rolling, snake handling, magicians, pig races, chain sawing, and stilt-walking. Vendors sell clothing, belt buckles, and other items with novelty designs 

The expositions have included: "Virginia World" which highlighted Virginia agricultural products, the better living center which hosted the arts & craft competition displays, the technology expo which highlighted Virginia technology industry, and "Young McDonald's Farm" which displayed a variety of young animals for the urban visitor to see.  Additionally, one section of the Fair has included a "Heritage Village" which displayed Native American, African American, and Euro-American history in the Commonwealth of Virginia.

Rides 
There is a special section of the park with rides for children ages 4-5. Those ages 6-12 have all the options of the 4-5 year olds, plus the merry go round and the airplane rider which goes around in a circle at slow speed. All individuals 12 and up have access to all the rides as long as they are 61 inches or above.

History
The Fair moved to its new location in 2009 at the Meadow Event Park in Caroline County. This multi-use space of  includes a  exposition hall, a  multi-purpose pavilion, a horse-stall barn with 143 stalls, and an equine facility with four show rings, to accommodate local and regional horse shows and other equine events. The Meadow Event Park is on the site of Meadow Farm, the thoroughbred horse farm owned by Christopher Chenery that was the breeding home of back-to-back racing greats Riva Ridge and Secretariat, the winners of five of the six Triple Crown races in 1972 and 1973.

No fair was held in 1861–64, 1917–18, 1942–45 & 2020.

Farm Bureau Purchase
In March 2012, the fair's parent company filed for chapter 7 bankruptcy, putting the fair on hold for the first time in its history. Reasons for the non-profit's bankruptcy included the high costs for converting Meadow Farm into Meadow Event Park. All events that the company ran were cancelled, except for the horse race at Colonial Downs.  On May 22, 2012, Universal Fairs, based in suburban Memphis, purchased the assets of State Fair of Virginia in bankruptcy court. In July 2012, the Virginia Farm Bureau Federation purchased an ownership interest and partnered with Universal Fairs, who plan to continue the fair. The Farm Bureau bought the remaining shares in 2013.

References

Further reading

External links

State Fair VA.org
Meadow Event Park.com

History of Virginia
Virginia
Virginia culture
Festivals established in 1854
1854 establishments in Virginia